Colin Coleman (born 1962) is a South African banker and public figure. He was previously the CEO of Goldman Sachs for Sub Saharan Africa. In January 2020, he left Goldman Sachs to become a senior fellow and lecturer at Yale University’s Jackson Institute for Global Affairs.
 
He has been interviewed by the BBC, CNN, France24, and CNBC Africa as an expert on issues such as the market, politics, and banking in South Africa.

Biography

Colin Coleman was born on October 31, 1962. In 1988 he graduated from the University of Witwatersrand in Johannesburg, South Africa with a BA in architecture. He became involved in South Africa's constitutional transition in the 1980s, and Business Insider writes that Coleman "spent years helping to dismantle Apartheid." In 1987, he became the national media officer of the National Union of South African Students, and starting in 1989 he held management positions with the Consultative Business Movement, Standard Bank Investment Corporation (SBIC), and Johannesburg's Standard Corporate & Merchant Banking. In the 1994 elections, he facilitated the International Mediation Forum, also brokering the agreement that “led to all parties participating” in the elections that year. He received the Business Statesman Award from Harvard Business School in 1994, and in 1996 he was one of the World Economic Forum’s Global Leaders for Tomorrow.

Coleman moved to London in 1997, where until 2000 he was at JP Morgan as vice president of energy, power and oil for JP Morgan’s Investment Banking Advisory Department. After JPMorgan he began working with Goldman Sachs, and in 2000 Goldman Sachs International appointed him as its head in South Africa. Goldman Sachs International named him a managing director in 2002, head of its Investment Banking Division for Sub-Saharan Africa in 2008, and a partner in 2010. That year Business Insider  named him one of the 11 Most Impressive New Partners At Goldman Sachs, and he was one of Euromoney’s World Top Ten “Financing leaders for the 21st Century." Coleman is currently a board member of the Business Leadership South Africa (BLSA), the National Business Initiative, and previously READ Development, Endeavor and the Business Election Fund.

Coleman ascribes to the CEO Pledge of South Africa, and co-chairs the Youth Employment Service (YES), a public and private enterprise partnership targeting creation of one million South African business paid youth internships.

References

External links
Coleman at Goldman Sachs

Living people
1962 births
South African business executives
Goldman Sachs people
South African bankers
University of the Witwatersrand alumni